The 1934–35 season saw Rochdale compete for their 14th season in the Football League Third Division North.

Statistics
																				

|}

Final league table

Competitions

Football League Third Division North

FA Cup

Third Division North Cup

Lancashire Cup

Manchester Cup

References

Rochdale A.F.C. seasons
Rochdale